The 2016 FIBA 3x3 Under-18 Asian Championships for Boys and Girls is the second edition of the FIBA Asia's 3x3 championship for boys and girls under the age of 18. The games were held at the Gem In Mall in Cyberjaya, Malaysia from 22-24 July. Qatar and Japan won the boys and girls tournaments respectively.

Boys

Preliminary round

Group A

|

|}

Group B

|

|}

Knockout round

Girls

Preliminary round

Group A

|

|}

Group B

|

|}

Knockout round

References

2016
International basketball competitions hosted by Malaysia
2016–17 in Asian basketball
2016–17 in Malaysian basketball
2016 in 3x3 basketball